Yopps Green is a hamlet in the Tonbridge and Malling District, in the county of Kent, England. It is part of the small village of Plaxtol.

Location 
Nearby settlements include the town of Sevenoaks, the villages of Borough Green and Ightham and the hamlet of Sheet Hill.

Transport 
It is about half a mile away from the A227 road.

References 
 A-Z Great Britain Road Atlas (page 181)

Hamlets in Kent
Tonbridge and Malling